Jacqueline Bonnell Marteau Emerson (born August 21, 1994) is an American actress and singer. She is best known for portraying Foxface in the film The Hunger Games (2012). She is also known for starring as Skye in the film The Last Survivors (2014).  

As a singer, she is a former member of the teenage pop band Devo 2.0, which was active from 2005 to 2007. In 2011, she recorded her first single "Peter Pan", and in 2012, her song "Catch Me If You Can" was released on YouTube.

Early life
Jacqueline Bonnell Marteau Emerson was born on August 21, 1994, in Washington D.C., U.S. to Kimberly Marteau, an attorney, and John B. Emerson, an attorney, a former White House aide during the Clinton presidency, and the former United States Ambassador to Germany during the Obama presidency. From a young age, Jacqueline pursued an interest in both acting and singing. She has since then participated in many voice-overs for both radio and television. She has also performed in numerous professional productions with Reprise, the Los Angeles Opera, and L.A. Theater Works. She attended Marlborough School in Los Angeles.

Emerson graduated from Stanford University in 2017, where she majored in Chinese and East Asian studies.

Career

Music
Emerson was a member of Disney's Devo 2.0 (a.k.a. DEV2.O), a Devo tribute band of teen performers. Emerson played keyboards in the project, which spawned a DVD and CD combo and was fully supported by the original Devo band members. In 2007, the novelty act broke up, when lead singer Nicole Stoehr and lead guitarist Nathan Norman quit and said they would never make music again because the album flopped. Emerson continued to write songs and perform music, where she started a YouTube Channel and released the music video of her single, "Peter Pan" and in the next year, "Catch Me If You Can". She later released an acoustic song, "Glass Fire In a Jar", in which she co-wrote with Adrianne Duncan.

Acting
She made her television debut providing the voice for a set of Tiger Twins in the 2004 animated CGI sitcom Father of the Pride.

In 2012, Emerson made her film debut in the science fiction adventure, The Hunger Games as the District 5 tribute, Foxface. In a 2013 interview, Emerson announced that she would be working on Son of the South. She appeared in the Video ETA's list of ten up and coming stars predicted to be A-listers by 2015, along with fellow The Hunger Games.

Filmography

Film

Television

Video games

Discography

DEV2.0 (2006)

Music videos

References

External links

1994 births
21st-century American actresses
Actresses from Washington, D.C.
American child actresses
American child singers
American film actresses
American television actresses
American voice actresses
Living people
Place of birth missing (living people)
21st-century American singers
21st-century American women singers